The Union Volunteer Emergency Squad provides emergency services for the Town of Union, New York, USA.

History
In 1972 the Town of Union (TOU) residents recognized a need for emergency medical services and ambulance transport.  A building was obtained at Hooper Road School on Main Street in Endwell, and the ambulance squad was placed in the basement. In 1973 Union Volunteer Emergency Squad (UVES) was established as an all volunteer service and responded to their first call on June 1, 1973.  Over the next 2 years, UVES established itself and became a training center for Broome County and helped to establish other ambulance services.  In 1975 West Endicott dissolved its ambulance service and was merged with UVES.  In the same year, Johnson City Fire Department requested UVES help with establishing their ambulance and UVES help purchase their 1st ambulance.

As UVES developed and grew from a BLS ambulance it acquired a cardiac monitor, with help from United Health Services and soon became a designated "Heart Mobile" ambulance staffed with "Cardiac Care" Techs (specialized EMT's).  ALS response was started at the start of June, 1975.

From 1975-1983 the facilities remained and responses were from the Hooper Rd, station until 1983 when the TOU acquired a building and a new 'Central Station' on Avenue B in Endwell, NY and was soon dedicated later in the year. As UVES call and response volume increased several more station were acquired to help spread resources over the TOU response district.  In 1987 a property already owned by the TOU was donated to UVES at Maple Street in Endicott, and soon a station was built, where ambulances and squad members could be stationed.  Several response headquarters were located in Johnson City, NY and finally in 1990 a single building was deemed "Panko Station" (named after Nick Panko for his efforts) which housed additional ambulances and squad members.  Out of these three station the entirely volunteer squad responded to a rising call volume of 3,000 calls a year.

As call volume again increased exponentially for UVES ambulance services, and in 1992 hired a director of operations who established a third-party billing system.  After the billing system was established extra resources were available and 4 full-time compensated members were hired to help fulfill the ever increasing demand.  Later that year and to this date, UVES provides on-duty EMS coverage 24 hours a day 7 days a week.

Until 2003, UVES was operated entirely from the revenue generated from the third-party billing.  In fall of 2003, the TOU presented to the residence and passed legislation that allowed for a tax district to support ambulance.   Later in the year in 2003 UVES ventured into new territory and started to provide 'non' emergency transport services for health care services in TOU.  New vehicles and employees helped with this venture which has now ceased due to operational pitfalls.  Both the tax district that was established along with the new transports and a lot of mutual aid helped with the increase in demand on the 911 system in the TOU.

To this date UVES responds to 9,700+ 911 calls and transport a year in the TOU with full staffed by 44 compensated employees, and 30+ volunteer EMT's, and ambulance aids as a full staff agency 24 hours a day 7 days a week in TOU. ambulance.

Stations

 Central station = Avenue B, Endwell NY
 East Station ("Panko" Station) = Riverside Drive, Johnson City NY
 West Station = Maple Street, Endicott NY

Ambulances and response vehicles

 7921 - Type III ambulance
 7922 - Type III ambulance
 7923 - Type III ambulance
 7924 - Type III ambulance
 7925 - Type III ambulance
 7926 - Type III ambulance
 7927 - Type III ambulance
 7928 - Type III ambulance
 7929 - Type III ambulance
 7951 - BLS Fly Car
 7953 - ALS Supervisor
 7961 - EMS modified John Deere Gator for off-road EMS applications

Communications
All 911 related emergency calls are dispatched through the consolidated Broome County Communications Center (BCCC). which holds all Fire, most EMS and Police dispatching for the county.  The BCCC has advanced Computer Aided Dispatching (CAD), as well as dispatching all calls through the Emergency Medical Dispatch (EMD) system.  All emergency dispatchers at BCCC hold the EMD certification.

External links
 Union EMS
 Endwell Fire Department
 Hapurs Ferry Ambulance
 Johnson City Fire Department
 Vestal Volunteer Emergency Squad (VVES)
 Union Center Fire Department
 Broome Volunteer Emergency Squad (BVES)
 Superior EMS
 Chenango Ambulance
 Susquehanna Regional EMS Inc. (SREMS)
 International Association of EMT's and Paramedics (IAEP)

References

Ambulance services in the United States
Medical and health organizations based in New York (state)